The Byblos International Festival is a Lebanese festival held in Byblos, believed to be the first Phoenician city, founded around 5000 BC. The festival is the biggest in Lebanon, and attracts thousands of tourists from all over the world.

History
The International Festival has been held annually since 2003, in July. It takes place by the seaside in the historic quarter, in front of the castle built by Crusaders in the 12th century. The festival's aims are to boost tourism, promote the Lebanese culture, and spread music and art from the Middle East to the rest of the world.

Performances

2003
 Oum (a musical about the life of Umm Kulthum)
 Gregorian
 Gotan Project
 Tosca
 Blind Boys of Alabama
 John Mayall & The Bluesbreakers

2004
 Bryan Ferry
 Star Academy Arab World
 Erik Truffaz
 Gabriel Gutierrez
 Josh Miguel Dabilbil
 Nash Dela Cruz
 Jimmy Cliff
 Munir Bashir Group (a group formed in memory of Munir Bashir)
 Placebo

2005
 Roger Hodgson
 Buena Vista Social Club presents Omara Portuondo
 Aziza Mustafa Zadeh

2006
 Francis Cabrel
 Barbara Hendricks

2007
 Nouvelle Vague
 Alessandro Safina

2008
 Patti Smith
 Vaya Con Dios
 Barbatuques
 Chucho Valdés Quintet
 Michel Legrand

On 12 July 2008, midway through the festival, Byblos held a Nuit Blanche. Among those who performed that night were:

 Lumi
 Sebastien Tellier
 Mouse on Mars
 Munma/Trash Inc.

2009
 Loreena McKennitt
 Keane
 Grease
 Jethro Tull
 Misia
 Gonzales (musician)
 Cocorosie
 Y.A.S.

2010
 Tribute to Wadih el Safi with Najwa Karam and Wael Kfoury
 Mashrou' Leila
 Caetano Veloso
 Jesse Cook
 Gorillaz
 Riverdance
 Le Nozze di Figaro (an opera by Mozart)

2011
 A musical based on Don Quixote, created by Marwan Ghadi and Oussama Rahbani.
 Scorpions
 Moby
 Florent Pagny
 Jamie Cullum
 Thirty Seconds to Mars
 Amadou & Mariam
 Les Mystères Lyriques

2012
 Slash
 Julien Clerc
 B.B. King
 Ute Lemper
 Kadim Al Sahir
 Snow Patrol
 Tinariwen

2013
 Yanni
 Nightwish
 Anuryzm
 CeeLo Green
 Lana Del Rey
 Pet Shop Boys
 OneRepublic
 Rahbani Summer Night
 Paco De Lucia
 Crazy Opera
 Scorpions

2014
 Lang Lang
 Marcel Khalife
 Yanni
 Massive Attack
 Epica
 Stromae
 Mulatu Astatke and Ibrahim Maalouf
 Guy Manoukian
 Beirut

2015
 John Legend
 The Script
 Michael Schenker's Temple of Rock
 Rodrigo Y Gabriela
 Gregory Porter
 Mireille Mathieu
 Hiba Tawaji
 Sacré Profane
 Alt-J

See also
Beiteddine Festival
Baalbeck International Festival
Ehmej Festival

References

External links
 Official website
 Byblos Festival on Facebook

Music festivals in Lebanon
Summer events in Lebanon